Plainspoken is a ballet made by principal dancer Benjamin Millepied on the Chamber Ensemble of New York City Ballet to eponymous music commissioned from Pulitzer Prize winner David Lang. The premiere took place on Friday, August 6, 2010, at the Center for the Arts, Jackson Hole, Wyoming; the NYCB premiere took place at the Fall gala on Thursday, October 7, at the David H. Koch Theater, Lincoln Center. Costumes were designed by Karen Young.

Casts

Original

Footnotes

Reviews 
 NY Times by Alastair Macaulay, October 9, 2010
 Wall Street Journal by Robert Greskovic, October 14, 2010
 NY Times by Roslyn Sulcas, October 17, 2010

Articles 
 NY Times by Chelsea Zalopany, October 8, 2010
New York City Ballet repertory
Ballets by Benjamin Millepied
2010 ballet premieres
Ballets designed by Karen Young
Ballets by David Lang